The Usk Bridge, Usk, Monmouthshire, carries the A472 over the River Usk. It is the town's oldest crossing of the river and is a Grade II* listed structure.

History and description
The existing stone bridge is constructed of Old Red Sandstone and is attributed to the Welsh bridge builder William Edwards. It was built between 1746 and 1747. It has five arches with pointed cutwaters between each arch. The bridge was widened in 1836-7, the widening maintaining the original appearance. The evidence of reconstruction can be seen in the arch soffits.

The bridge was designated a Grade II* listed structure in 1974. The architectural historian John Newman described it as "traditional but well-proportioned". It has been subject to considerable damage by traffic in the 21st century.

See also
List of bridges in Wales

Notes

Sources
 

Bridges over the River Usk
Infrastructure completed in 1747
Grade II* listed bridges in Wales
Grade II* listed buildings in Monmouthshire
Road bridges in Wales
Stone bridges in the United Kingdom